Mohammad Khakpour (born February 20, 1969) is a retired Iranian football player.

Playing career 

Khakpour played for a few clubs, including Persepolis FC, Pas Tehran, Vanspor, Geylang United and MetroStars (United States). He played for the Iran national football team and was a participant at the 1998 FIFA World Cup. After his season long stay at MetroStars, he lived in California where he decided to start a football club, known as MK Soccer Club.

Coaching career

Early career 

He has a national "A" coaching license. In early August 2006, Khakpour signed as Foolad's assistant coach under Mohammad Mayeli Kohan for the 2006–07 Iran Pro League season, but left the club after Mayeli Kohan's departure from Foolad.

Steel Azin 

He was appointed as the head coach of Steel Azin on 1 December 2010. He resigned from his post on 3 March 2011.

Iran under-23 

Khakpour was Iran national under-23 football team's technical manager before being appointed as team head coach on 16 December 2014 for the 2016 Olympic qualifiers. He led Iran's under-23 team to win the 2015 WAFF U-23 Championship.

Career statistics

International goals

Manager

Honours

Player
Persepolis
Asian Cup Winners' Cup (1): 1990-91, 1992-93 (Runner-up)
Tehran Province League (1): 1990-91
Hazfi Cup (1): 1991-92
Iran 
Asian Games Gold Medal (1): 1998

Individual
AFC Asian Cup Team of the Tournament: 1996

Manager
WAFF U23 Championships
 Gold Medal (1): 2015

References

External links

MK Soccer Club Official Website

1969 births
Living people
Iranian footballers
Iran international footballers
Association football defenders
1992 AFC Asian Cup players
1996 AFC Asian Cup players
1998 FIFA World Cup players
Pas players
Persepolis F.C. players
Geylang International FC players
Vanspor footballers
Bahman players
New York Red Bulls players
Azadegan League players
Singapore Premier League players
Süper Lig players
Major League Soccer players
Iranian expatriate footballers
Iranian expatriate sportspeople in Turkey
Iranian expatriate sportspeople in the United States
Expatriate footballers in Singapore
Expatriate footballers in Turkey
Expatriate soccer players in the United States
Iranian football managers
American soccer coaches
Asian Games gold medalists for Iran
Asian Games medalists in football
Footballers at the 1998 Asian Games
Medalists at the 1998 Asian Games
20th-century Iranian people